Events in the year 2023 in Eritrea.

Incumbents

Events 

 January 21 – Tigrayan peace process: Eritrean forces withdraw from Shire and other major towns in the Tigray Region of Ethiopia.

See also 

COVID-19 pandemic in Africa
Tigray War
African Union
Common Market for Eastern and Southern Africa
Community of Sahel–Saharan States

References 

 
2020s in Eritrea
Years of the 21st century in Eritrea
Eritrea
Eritrea